De Nobili School, Mugma is a private Catholic primary and secondary school located in Mugma, a settlement in the Dhanbad district of the state of Jharkhand, India. Founded by the Jesuits in 1977, the English-medium school teaches students from grade one to grade twelve and prepares students for the Indian Certificate of Secondary Education (ICSE) examination in class 10 and for the Indian School Certificate (ISC) in class 12.

The school is named after a christian missionary and Jesuit, Roberto de Nobili, who was the first foreigner to master Sanskrit, incognito, in sixteenth century Madurai. He apparently conducted himself like an orthodox Brahmin and is even said to have declared himself to be a descendant of Brahma.

See also

 List of Jesuit schools
 List of schools in Jharkhand
 Violence against Christians in India

References  

Jesuit secondary schools in India
Jesuit primary schools in India
Christian schools in Jharkhand
High schools and secondary schools in Jharkhand
Education in Dhanbad district
Educational institutions established in 1977
1977 establishments in Bihar